The Battle of Ciudad Universitaria was a belligerent confrontation at the start of the defense of Madrid in the Spanish Civil War. This battle happened in the new campus area of the Ciudad Universitaria from 15 to 23 November 1936 (approximately a week) leaving a stable front until the end of the war. The republican militias' objective was "the defense of the capital at all costs", and for that, it was necessary to stop the advance of general Valera's troops and the fall of Madrid. On the other side, the attackers had as an objective to "conquer the city" as fast as possible. The persistence and tenacity of both sides in the battle meant an inflection point on the Spanish Civil War, partly because it was the first time that Franco's troops were stopped. The campus was also one of the most long-lasting confrontation points during the Spanish Civil War. The resistance shown in Madrid raised the morale of other fronts amongst the Gobierno de la República's controlled zone. The end of the battling period on 23 November 1936 was because of a change in strategy on part of the attackers. Between the main characteristics of this confrontation, it is worth mentioning the entrance to battle, for the first time in this war, of the varied troops that belonged to the International Brigades, just like the heavy military material of Soviet origins. The attackers received material and troops from Germany and Italy, being also one of the first times in history in which aerial bombing against the civil population was used.

On 8 November 1936, general Valera's militarily planned frontal assault started with an initial approach to the Casa de Campo. This attack moved the focal point of the attack to the northeast to occupy the zone between Ciudad Universitaria and Plaza de España. This first frontal attack was very bloody on both sides and made a slow advance amongst the troops that directed the main axis of effort through la Casa de Campo to a stream of the river Manzanares. In this stream, the attackers saw the necessity of advancing through the bridges that were held by the militia troops. After various failed attempts to cross the Manzanares, they get to the other side through the space between two bridges. The battle of Ciudad Universitaria started on 15 November spreading the conflict all throughout the campus. The fierce violence for occupying the city and the determination to stop the advance maintains itself on both sides. Both sides start running out of tactics as the death count goes up and the battle carries out between the faculties and diverse buildings of the campus. This confrontation is characterized by the fight inside the buildings, room by room, floor by floor. After a whole week of intense fighting and slow advance, general Franco has a reunion on the Cuartel General de Leganés, and on 23 November, the attackers' strategy changes: they would indirectly attack Madrid with a maneuver on the axis Las Rozas-Húmera (nowadays a neighborhood in Pozuelo de Alarcón) less than 2 kilometers northeast to the campus, which gave way to other battles like the Jarama (February 1937) and later the Guadalajara (March 1937). The campus' front was in a wedge form, whose corner was the Clínico, maintaining its lines practically the same during the rest of the Civil War. Even if the front stayed the same, there was a fierce battle in the Ciudad Universitaria and Parque del Oeste with mines and countermines, all with unsuccessful infantry offensives until on 28 March 1939 the colonel Segismundo Casado surrendered the city to the attacking troops.

As a result of the battle, the campus of the Ciudad Universitaria and the adjacent parts of the city were badly damaged. Ironically, the buildings were not used for the first time as a university, but as a war front. It was not until some years later that it was possible to recover normal docent activities in some faculties. The state in which the campus was left made the idea of a thematic park of the Civil War be established there, but the idea led to nothing in the end. The war caught the University in the middle of a changing state since many of the faculties that were in the urban center were going to rejoin slowly in the newly built campus. The war came unexpectedly and they were used in combats instead of studying places. The reconstruction of the faculties led that on 12 October 1943 the new precinct was inaugurated, starting the academic year. Several monuments were also built, dedicated to the commemoration of the victory of Franco's army, including the Arco de la Victoria built between 1950 and 1956 and the Monumento a Los Caídos Por España (nowadays the headquarters of the Junta Municipal del Distrito de Moncloa-Aravaca). The scars that the battle left have been hidden by the reconstruction of the faculties, the reconstruction of the surroundings Moncloa-Aravaca and the consequences of the urbanistic expansion of the '70s, just as remodeling projects like the burying of the M-30 and the creation of parks at the shore of the Manzanares like Madrid Río.

The setting

The Ciudad Universitaria is an urban space nearby Moncloa. Its original concept was of a social and architectonic place, an initiative of King Alfonso XIII at the beginning of the 20th century. This project's goal was to give Madrid a condensed area with all the faculties, nine investigating labs, and a student dormitory. It was also a way to amplify the Alcalá de Henares' offer. It was finally decided to establish the Ciudad Universitaria in the state property terrain called La Moncloa. The construction starts and the company in charge will be Agromán. The faculties of Medicine, Pharmacy, and Odontology start on 6 November 1930. The construction of the Hospital Clínico began in 1932 and continued until the civil war stopped the construction of this and other buildings in the vicinity. The inauguration plans and the start of the school year were initially scheduled for the final months of 1936, but the social revolts and constant labor problems delayed the construction and the inauguration.

La Ciudad Universitaria

In the month of August of 1936, due to the rumors of advancing belligerent troops towards Madrid, the docent activities had been suspended in wait of "new events". There was still some administrative activity, although very limited due to the instability of the situation. There are lists of the professors that have been put aside in August, just as new books destined for the library begin to arrive. The professors and the workers in the Universidad Central move to Valencia in November. Until on 5 November, suspicions that this will be the setting for the attack on Madrid do not arise. The military cartography used by both sides to describe the operation theatre corresponds to the Hoja 559 IV (Cuadrante 5E) del Plano Director de Pozuelo de Alarcón elaborated in the Talleres del Ministerio de la Guerra of August 1937.

Although the campus was still under construction when the armed conflict started, it had plenty of buildings with part of the facilities almost operative. Since the beginning of November, the area became a prolonged battlefield and many of its buildings were seriously damaged in the clamor of the battle, the philosophy and letters faculty being the most affected. The testimonies of the destruction were gathered from brigade members that fought in the battle like John Sommerfield, Dan Kurzman, Bernard Knox and writers like Marta Torres Santo Domingo. Three-quarters of the university was occupied by the revolting army on 23 November. During the rest of the conflict many trenches, gun nests, refuges of all types, and bunkers were built all throughout the area of the campus, even though the front suffered almost no changes. It was the mine war the final ending that modified completely the orography of the zone.

Starting on the banks of the Manzanares, the buildings of the Ciudad Universitaria were scattered in a slight uphill slope. The battle took place with the defending army at a higher altitude than the attackers at all times. There were a few buildings in the area, despite only having been built four faculties (Medicine, Pharmacy, Science and Philosophy) and the Architecture, Veterinary and Agrarian Engineers. Over the Parque del Oeste there was the National Sanity Institute, the Veterinary School, the Antirrabies Department, and the Fundación del Amo (a student's residence for American students with a capacity of 100 students) and the Student's Residency. In a more northern position, there was the Palacete de la Moncloa and the Monumento a Los Héroes de las Campañas Coloniales (disappeared nowadays). In the back, there is a group of buildings with the Hospital Clínico being the most notable from them. Behind it, there was Madrid's urban area. In 1936, Madrid's urban zone from around this area was an uninterrupted series of solars. Thanks to the operations of the combat engineers colonel Tomás Ardiz Rey in collaboration with Carlos Masquelet, the Casa de Campo, the Moncloa zone and the Ciudad Universitaria became stronger.

The Casa de Campo and Manzanares' bridges

The Casa de Campo was completely enclosed by a wall of Toledan wall covering its exterior. Its outline was created by Francesco Sabatini and it was the model of the private park for the royal pleasure that it had been used for until 1931. There were around ten entries all along the wall, the only two that were close by were the river and the angel ones. Between the Casa de Campo and the Ciudad Universitaria, there was the Manzanares' river bed, which in 1936 had abundant vegetation proceeding from the Pardo mountain. The Manzanares' was channeled from the Toledo bridge to the Franceses bridge, which meant that from the Franceses' until San Fernando's bridge was not channeled. The channeled zone was heavily defended, was very dangerous for the attacking forces' infantry, and made the passing of the tanks difficult. It was because of these reasons that the channeled zone was avoided, advancing a few meters up from the Franceses' bridge, where it was relatively easier for attacking forces to advance. This configuration of the unchanneled river was what directed the combat definitively towards the Ciudad Universitaria on 15 November 1936. The Manzanares' river, which had a small river flow in summer, on the contrary, is on its highest influence during autumn.

On the Manzanares' two banks there were two wide roads. The one on the right bank was the road to Castilla, the one on the left bank lowers through the Parque del Oeste and continues until the Puerta de Hierro and formed part of the National Circuit of Firmes Especiales. The two banks are connected by various bridges of important strategic valor. The three bridges closer to Ciudad Universitaria are the San Fernando (the road to A Coruña), the Nuevo bridge (for railway use) and in parallel, just a few meters away, the Franceses (roadway to Irún). The rest of the bridges were immersed in the center of dispersed populations that still were part of Madrid. There were also a few footbridges all along the river. Some protagonist bridges in the battle were made viaducts to save the slope of the roads and the roadway systems. For example, the viaduct of the Quince Ojos that supported the road to La Coruña (surpassing the slope of the Cantalasranas stream), just like the Aire bridge.

The battle took place in the first months of the Civil War in the University City of Madrid, at the new campus of Madrid's Complutense University. It lasted for about a week, between 15 and 23 November 1936, after which the front stabilized until the end of the war. The aim of the Republican militias was to defend the capital at any price, stop the advances of General José Varela columns, and prevent the fall of Madrid into Nationalist hands.

On the other hand, the attacking armies of the military rebellion aimed to "take the city" within the shortest possible time.
This battle signaled the beginning of a new phase in the Spanish Civil War. Until then, the Francoist troops had been advancing relatively unopposed across Spain, conquering large swathes of territory in a few months. But here, at the Ciudad Universitaria, they encountered fierce and relentless opposition for the first time.

See also 
 List of Spanish Republican military equipment of the Spanish Civil War
 List of Spanish Nationalist military equipment of the Spanish Civil War

References

Ciudad Universitaria
1936 in Spain
Ciudad Universitaria
Ciudad Universitaria
Attacks on schools in Europe
Complutense University of Madrid
November 1936 events
1930s in Madrid